A snow blower or snow thrower is a machine for removing snow from an area where it is problematic, such as a driveway, sidewalk, roadway, railroad track, ice rink, or runway. The commonly used term "snow blower" is a misnomer, as the snow is moved using an auger or impeller instead of being blown (by air). It can use either electric power (line power or battery), or a gasoline or diesel engine to throw snow to another location or into a truck to be hauled away.  This is in contrast with the action of snow plows, which push snow to the front or side. Typically, the snow is discharged to one side.

Snow blowers can generally be divided into two classes: single-stage and two-stage. On a single-stage snow blower, the auger (the paddle mechanism visible from the front) pulls snow into the machine and directs it out of a discharge chute. The auger contacts the ground, making single-stage snow blowers unsuitable for use on unpaved surfaces. On a two-stage snow blower, the auger pulls snow into the machine and feeds it into a high-speed impeller, which in turn directs it out of a discharge chute. Two-stage snow blowers can generally handle deeper snow depths than single-stage ones, and because their augers don't touch the ground, they can be used on unpaved surfaces.

Depending on the design, snowblowers can be pressed into service throwing other things, such as water.

History

Robert Carr Harris of Maple Green, New Brunswick patented a "Railway Screw Snow Excavator" in 1870. In 1923, Robert E. Cole patented a snowplow that operated by using cutters and a fan to blow snow from a surface. Various other innovations also occurred. However, it is Arthur Sicard (1876–1946) who is generally credited as the inventor of the first practical snow blower. In 1925 Sicard completed his first prototype, based on a concept he described in 1894. He founded Sicard Industries in Sainte-Thérèse, Quebec and by 1927 his vehicles were in use removing snow from the roadways of the town of Outremont, now a borough of Montreal. His company is now a division of SMI-Snowblast, Inc. of Watertown, New York.

Safety issues
The U.S. Consumer Product Safety Commission estimates that each year there are approximately 5,740 snowblower related injuries in the United States which require medical attention. One problem with the design of the snow blower is that snow can build up in the auger, jamming it and stalling the motor. This is complicated by the fact that the auger could deform before applying enough resistance to the motor to turn it off. If the jam is cleared by hand, it is possible for the auger to return to its natural shape suddenly and with great force, possibly injuring the operator.  Snow blowers are a leading cause of traumatic hand and finger amputations. The correct procedure is to turn off the engine, disengage the clutch and then clear the jam with a broom handle or other long object.  In an effort to improve safety, many manufacturers now include a plastic tool to be used to clear jams, often mounted directly to the snow blower.

Most modern machines mitigate this problem by including a safety system known as the "Dead man's switch" to prevent the mechanism from rotating when the operator is not at the controls. They are mandatory in some jurisdictions.

Jet-engine snow blowers

Jet engines and other gas turbines are used for large scale propelling and melting of snow over rails and roads. These blowers first were used in Russia and Canada in the 1960s, and were later introduced into the U.S. by the Boston Transportation Authority.

The jet engine both melts and blows the snow, clearing the tracks faster than other methods. While offering considerably greater power in a relatively lightweight machine, this method is much more expensive than traditional snow removing methods. In Russia, the high cost is partially negated by utilizing retired military jet engines, such as the Klimov VK-1.

See also
 Small engine
 Snowplow
 Power shovel

References

Snowplows
Snow removal
Canadian inventions
Machinery